A by-election was held for the Australian House of Representatives seat of Kalgoorlie on 18 December 1920. It was triggered by the expulsion from the House of Labor Party MP Hugh Mahon.

The subsequent by-election was won by Nationalist Party candidate George Foley. , it is the only federal by-election at which the government has won a seat from the opposition. Voting was not compulsory in 1920.

Background
After the death of the Irish nationalist Terence McSwiney, as the result of a hunger strike in October 1920, Mahon attacked British policy in Ireland, and the British Empire as a whole, at an open-air meeting in Melbourne on 7 November, referring to it as "this bloody and accursed despotism". Subsequently, Prime Minister Billy Hughes moved to expel him from the House of Representatives. On 12 November, the House passed a resolution stating that Mahon had made "seditious and disloyal utterances at a public meeting" and was "guilty of conduct unfitting him to remain a member of this House and inconsistent with the oath of allegiance which he has taken as a member of this House". Mahon thereby became the only MP to be expelled from the Federal Parliament.

Under Section 8 of the Parliamentary Privileges Act 1987, neither house of the Australian Parliament now has the power to expel someone from membership of the Parliament.

Results

See also
 List of Australian federal by-elections

References

1920 elections in Australia
Western Australian federal by-elections
1920s in Western Australia